Tom Woodson Poor (December 15, 1903 – December 20, 1965) was an American track and field athlete who competed in the 1924 Summer Olympics. He was born in Bismarck, Missouri and died in Grove, Oklahoma.

He won the 1923 NCAA Championship in the high jump with a jump of 6 feet, 1 inch, while competing for University of Kansas. In 1924 he finished fourth in the high jump competition.

More than 600 athletes participated in the 1st annual Kansas relays on April 20, 1923.[3] During the relays early years the meet featured collegiate athletes in track and field such as Tom Poor, Ed Weir, and Tom Churchill were some of the athletes who later competed in the Olympics.[1][3] Tom Poor was the first to win the high jump event in Kansas Relays, with a jump of six feet and a quarter inch.[3] He later went on to place fourth in the 1924 Olympics. He paved the way for other athletes competing  in the track and field events in the Mid-West.

References

External links 
 

1903 births
1965 deaths
People from St. Francois County, Missouri
American male high jumpers
Olympic track and field athletes of the United States
Athletes (track and field) at the 1924 Summer Olympics